Pennsylvania State Game Lands Number 329 are Pennsylvania State Game Lands in Columbia County and Schuylkill County, in Pennsylvania, in the United States. The game lands are mainly forested, but there is also some farmland. Little Catawissa Creek passes through them. The main game animals in these game lands include bear, deer, grouse, squirrel, and turkey.

Geography
The borough of Centralia is to the southwest of the game lands.

The terrain in Pennsylvania State Game Lands #329 is predominantly forested. However, there are also some tracts of farmland. The topography of the game lands ranges from flat to steep.

Pennsylvania Route 42 passes fairly close to Pennsylvania State Game Lands #329. A stream known as Little Catawissa Creek also passes through the game lands. Most of the land in the game lands is to the north of the watershed.

Biology
The main game animals in Pennsylvania State Game Lands #329 include bear, deer, grouse, squirrel, and wild turkey. Cottontail rabbits are also in the game lands and pheasants are stocked there.

History and recreation

Pennsylvania State Game Lands #329 are open 24 hours per day, year-round. However, they are sometimes difficult to access in the winter. The game lands are mainly accessed via Aristes/Ringtown Road. The game lands are managed mainly for activities related to wildlife and hunting.

Pennsylvania State Game Lands #329 are relatively new. In 2005, the board of the Pennsylvania Game Commission approved a proposal to purchase a  tract of land adjacent to Pennsylvania State Game Lands #329 in Union Township, Schuylkill County. The tract mainly contains mixed hardwood and was to be purchased from the Municipal Authority of the Borough of Shenandoah for $205,000.

See also
 Pennsylvania State Game Lands Number 13, also in Columbia County
 Pennsylvania State Game Lands Number 55, also in Columbia County
 Pennsylvania State Game Lands Number 58, also in Columbia County
 Pennsylvania State Game Lands Number 106, also located in Schuylkill County
 Pennsylvania State Game Lands Number 110, also located in Schuylkill County
 Pennsylvania State Game Lands Number 226, also in Columbia County

References

External links
Official website of the Pennsylvania Game Commission

Protected areas of Columbia County, Pennsylvania
329